Lycée Victor Hugo is a French international school in Marrakech, Morocco, serving levels collège (middle school) and lycée (sixth form college/senior high school).

The school was founded in the 1960s in the former quartier Lamy, a part of a French military assembly area, after the previously established primary and secondary schools were given to the Moroccan government.

It is a part of the Cité Scolaire Hugo-Renoir, which also houses the primary school École Auguste Renoir.

References

External links
 Lycée Victor Hugo 

International schools in Marrakesh
French international schools in Morocco
Educational institutions established in 1966
1966 establishments in Morocco
20th-century architecture in Morocco